Vitthala-natha or Vitthalanath (IAST: Viṭṭhalanātha, c. 1516–1588), popularly known as Gusainji, was an Indian philosopher. He was the younger son of Vallabhacharya, who founded the Pushtimarg religious sect of Hinduism.

Names 
The name Vitthalanatha is also pronounced as Vitthalnath in modern vernaculars because of schwa deletion. His other names include Vitthaleshvara (IAST: Viṭṭhaleśvara), Vitthala Dikshita, or Agnikumara. In addition, he is known by the title Gosvami (Gosain-ji or Gusain-ji).

About 
Sri Vitthaleshwara Deekshita, the author of the Vidvanmandana was the second son of sri Vallabhacharya. He wad born at Charanata near Allahabad on the 9 th day of the dark half of margasrsha , 1572, Samvat. Vallabhacharya in his later life adopted Adel as his permanent residence, and therefore Vitthales’vara passed his childhood there. When Vallabhacharya took up TridandaSannyasa in 1587, Vitthales’vara was a boy, Fifteen years old. His elder brother Sri Gopinatha was Senior to him by five years. Vallabhacharya, but his early education seems to have been of a Desultory character. A Gatha current in sampradaya states that Vitthalesvara in his childhood was given to playfulness. He did not seem to realize the heavy responsibility that lay on his shoulders, so Damodaradasa, the chief among Vaishnavas, is said to have remonstrated with young Vitthalesvara and persuaded him to study, and thus be fit to bear the responsibility as the worthy father. There is no doubt that Damodaradasa had his share in turning Vithhalesvara from worldly playfulness to the meditation of Krishna-leela. Chacha harivanshji was another personality who influenced Vitthaleshwara in varansiji’s proselytizing tendencies were great. It was he who generally visited a place in advance and prepares it for the acceptance of Vitthaleshwara teachings. It is not known from whom Vitthaleshwara got direct help in the profound learning which is manifest in his works which are available now. A Gatha says that Vitthaleshwara was sent by Vallabhacharya to Madhva Sarasvati for his time to reading Srimad Bhagavata. Whatever may be the truth in the above Gatha, it is an undisputed fact that like his father , vitthaleshwara had a very great hold on and absorbing attachment to srimad Bhagavata. After Vallabhacharya passed away in 1587, Gopinatha and Vitthalesvara lived together at Adel. Sri Gopinatha and his son Shri Purushottama seem to have passed away between 1599 and 1606. After this, Vitthaleshwara became the recognized representative of his father, and thereafter he seems to have planned various tours , and thought of writing works for the propagation of the Sampradaya.

Unlike Sankara, Ramauja, Madhava, Chaitanya, and a host of others, Vallabhacharya preferred to follow the Aupanishada traditions, and like Yajnyavalkya and othes, become a Grihastha Acharya. After him, his elder son too, become a Grihastha Acharya. Sri Gopinatha got Vitthaleshvara married to sri Rukmini, a daughter of Visvanatha Bhatta and Bhawani of his own caste. The relations of the two brothers were of a very cordial nature. A letter addressed by Vitthaleshwara to his elder brother reveals the high regard which he had for him.

When Gopinathaji and his son Purushottamji passed away, Vitthaleshwara seems to have begun his tours. His first visit was from Adel to Gujarat in the year 1600, and his second visit to Gujarat was also from Adel in 1613. In Gujarat his activities were chiefly confined to Ahmedabad, Cambhat and Godhra. In Godhra, one Nagaji Bhatta was initiated in the Sampradaya by him. This Nagaji Bhatta was, it is said, a State-officer, and the name Pancha Mahals owes its origin to his activities. He was a Sathodra Brahmin. Mr. Keshavlal Harshadraya Dhruva, the veteran Gijarati Scholar, is said to be a descendant of this Nagaji Bhatta. Whenever Vitthaleshvara visited Gujarat, Nagaji Bhatta always took advantage of his company. A few of the original letters addressed by Vitthaleshvara to Nagaji Bhatta are preserved even to this day at nathadwara in Mewar. Nagaji Bhatta seems to have been a very intelligent follower. Various questions seem to have been put by him to Vitthalesvara. He seems to have been a very active agent in spreading the doctrines of Vallabhacharya in his country. After having read Subodhini, Nibandha, etc., he wanted to know Vallabhacharya’s teaching. In answer to this query, Vitthaleshwara sent to him a beautiful couplet which summaries the doctrine in the choicest words. It runs as follows:

According to the view of Vallabhacharaya , Bhagavatprakatya is the phal (fruit), and the unfailing remedy for it is love. Nagaji Bhatta remained in the company of Vitthalesvara not only in Gujarat, but he often visited Adel to pay his respect to him. He is said also to have visited the shrine of Shri Nathaji- Govardhanadhara- at Jatipura on the Govardhana Hill , And stayed there for a couple of months. Thus it would seem that Nagaji Bhatta was familiar both with the practise and theory of the Sampradaya, from samvat 1600 onwards in Gujarat.

Another personality who helped in the spread of Sampradaya was bhail Kothari of Asarva near Ahmedabad. When Vitthaleshwara visited Dwarka or Gujarat, he used to put up with him for a couple of months. Bhailas son-in-law Gopaladasa has given the Sampradaya a charming and unique poem in Navakhyana. The Sampradayika Gatha relates that this Gopaladas was Narsinhna Metha in his preceding birth. Whatever that may be, it helps one in furnishing the latest date of Narsinha Mehta . Vitthaleshwara’s first visit to Gujarat was in 1600 St, and Gopaladasa was then nine years old. The poem of Gopaladasa (Nava Khayana) has been the most popular and revered among Vaishnavas. Every Vaishnava, male and female recites it. The commercial people of Gujarat have been fascinated by it . This poem, it , seems, has been instrumental in shaping Vaishnava attitude towards the Maharajas. The intensely tender feelings with which the Maharajas are looked upon have their genesis in the spread of this lyric. It speaks of Vittalesvara as Goswamiji. From this it would seem that this poem of Gopaladasa could not have composed before 1634. The Sampradayika Gatha informs Vitthaleshwara himself. It is said that Gopaladasa from was dumb, miraculously got his powers of speech as a result of the chewing of the betel leaf offered by Vitthaleshwara.
In Cambhat, Jiva Parekh, a celebrated Bania merchant was instrumental in the early spread of Vaishnavavism. On the whole the spread of Vaishnavism in Gujarat was not only rapid but complete. Numerous castes and sub-caste wholly embraced the Vaishnava cult. This continued in increasing proportions during the times of the succeeding generations Vitthaleshwara.

Vitthaleshwara himself visited Gujarat not less than six times. His first visit was in 1600 from Adel. The second was also from Adel in 1613. The third one was from Gada in 1619. The fourth one was from Mathura in 1623. The fifth one was in 1631 from Gokul. And the sixth and last visit was also from Gokula in 1638. This would show that for nearly forty years Vitthaleshwara exercised his influence over Gujarat and Kathiawad . The visits to Gujarat were incidential to his visit to the shrine of Dwarkanathji at Dwarka. His desire for and interest in Dwaraka and Gujarat were created by the early reception of this father and his elder brother Sri Gopinatha. Rana Vyasa, a learned pupil of Vallabhacharya , Was an active worker at Siddhapura. So also there was one Gopaladasa of Naroda. Vallabhacharya himself had visited Dwaraka not less three times, his last visit begin in 1585. He is said to have stayed at Dwaraka for over six months. The Swarupa of Dwarkanathaji at Bet- Dwarka was installed there by Vallabhacharya.

In the year 1616 Maha Vad 13th Vitthaleshwara visited the shrine of Jaganatha in Puri (Orissa). He was there accompanied by his wife Rukmini, his elder daughter Shobhabetiji and his eldest son Giridharaji. He stayed there for nearly six months. After witnessing the Rathotsava at Puri, he seems to have returned to Adel. During his visit to Puri he had taken with him a carpenter by name Rasa . This was with a view to see the model of the Jagannatha Car. It is said that when Vitthaleshwara returned to Adel, he got a car prepared of a similar model, and took his deity round the village of Adel in a procession . During his stay at Gada also he celebrated a Rathotsava similarly. But when he shifted his abode to Mathura he had to give up the public celebration of Rathosava on account of the Mahomendan fanasticism . During his stay in Jagannatha , Vitthaleshwara came in contact with the immediate followers of Chaitanya, living there.

Early life 
Vitthalanatha was born around 1516 (between 1515 and 1518), as the second son of the religious scholar Vallabha.

His devotees consider him an incarnation of the god Vithoba (Vitthal) of Pandharpur. He was brought up by Vallabha till the age of 15, and after that, by Vallabha's disciple Damodara-dasa.

He was proficient in the Vedas, the Brahma Sutra, and the Mimansa philosophy. He studied nyaya at Navadvipa.

Religious activities 
After the deaths of his father Vallabhacharya (c. 1530), his elder brother Gopinatha, and Gopinatha's son Purushottama (c. 1550), Vitthalanatha emerged as the main leader of the religious sect established by his father. Initially, he faced some opposition from Krishnadasa, a manager of the Shrinathji Temple. Krishnadasa banned Vitthalanatha from entering the temple because of personal disputes, but later, reconciled with him. Vitthalanatha forgave him, and made him in-charge of the Govardhan Hill temple.

Vitthalanatha propagated the teachings of his father, and established a religious centre at Gokul.

Literary works 
The texts and commentaries attributed to Vitthala include:

 Arya
 Avatarataratamya-stotra
 Bhakti-hamsa
 Bhakti-hetu-nirnaya
 Gita-govinda-prathamashtapadi-vivriti
 Jalabheda-tika
 Krishna-premamrita
 Nyasa-desha-vivarana-prabodha
 Premamrita-bhashya
 Shringara-rasa-mandanam (Śr̥ṅgāra-rasa-maṇḍanam)
 Vidvan-Mandanam (Vidvan-maṇḍanam)
 Vidya-mandana

References

Bibliography 

 
 
 
 

16th-century Hindu religious leaders
1516 births
1588 deaths
1516 in India
Scholars from Varanasi
Sanskrit writers